Muellama (Muellamués) is an extinct Barbacoan language of Colombia.

References 

Awan languages
Extinct languages of South America
Languages of Colombia